Madala Rangarao (25 May 1948 – 27 May 2018) was an Indian actor and producer primarily active in Telugu cinema. He was born in Mynampadu of Prakasam district. He is noted for Erra Cinema or revolutionary movies in Telugu film industry. He is popularly known as Red Star by people and associated with Communist Party of India and Prajanatya Mandali. Ranga Rao started his career with satirical Telugu film Chairman Chalamayya (1974). He started his own banner Navataram Pictures and produced and acted in movies like Yuvatharam Kadilindi (1980) and had received a Golden Nandi award from the then AP government for his production 'Yuvatharam Kadilindi. His much acclaimed film was Erra Mallelu (1981) which also introduced his son Madala Ravi as a Child Artist, Mahaprasthanam (1982), Praja Shakthi (1983), Veera Bhadrudu (1984),
Swarajyam, Maro Kurukshetram and Erra Suryudu. He acted in films such as Erra Pavuralu. "My films do not spread the naxalite ideology. They are aimed at bringing about social change," he said. He has shown dark angles in politics and social issues in his films.

Best known for his left ideology based movies; Madala Ranga Rao had produced more than 12 films and acted in more than 65 films. He rose to stardom in the '80s with movies like 'Yuvatharam Kadilindi', 'Erra Mallelu', 'Swarajyam', 'Viplava Shankham', 'Erra Pavuralu', etc. He won two Nandi Awards.

Death
Ranga Rao died in the early morning on Sunday 27 May 2018 in STAR Hospital Hyderabad, Telangana.

Awards
Nandi Awards
 He won Nandi Award for Second Best Story Writer - Yuvatharam Kadilindi
Second Best Feature Film - Silver - Yuvatharam Kadilindi

References

External links
 

1948 births
2018 deaths
Indian male film actors
Male actors in Telugu cinema
20th-century Indian male actors
21st-century Indian male actors
Film producers from Andhra Pradesh
People from Prakasam district
People from Ongole
Ongole
Telugu film producers